Einsteinium (99Es) is a synthetic element, and thus a standard atomic weight cannot be given. Like all synthetic elements, it has no stable isotopes. The first isotope to be discovered (in nuclear fallout from the Ivy Mike H-bomb test) was 253Es in 1952. There are 18 known radioisotopes from 240Es to 257Es, and 3 nuclear isomers (250mEs, 254mEs, and 256mEs). The longest-lived isotope is 252Es with a half-life of 471.7 days, or around 1.293 years.

List of isotopes 

|-
| rowspan=2|240Es
| rowspan=2 style="text-align:right" | 99
| rowspan=2 style="text-align:right" | 141
| rowspan=2|240.06892(43)#
| rowspan=2|6(2) s
| α
| 236Bk
| rowspan=2|
|-
| β+ (rare)
| 240Cf
|-
| rowspan=2|241Es
| rowspan=2 style="text-align:right" | 99
| rowspan=2 style="text-align:right" | 142
| rowspan=2|241.06854(24)#
| rowspan=2|10(5) s[8(+6−5) s]
| α
| 237Bk
| rowspan=2|(3/2−)
|-
| β+ (rare)
| 241Cf
|-
| rowspan=3|242Es
| rowspan=3 style="text-align:right" | 99
| rowspan=3 style="text-align:right" | 143
| rowspan=3|242.06975(35)#
| rowspan=3|13.5(25) s
| α (99.94%)
| 238Bk
| rowspan=3|
|-
| β+, SF (.6%)
| (various)
|-
| β+ (rare)
| 242Cf
|-
| rowspan=2|243Es
| rowspan=2 style="text-align:right" | 99
| rowspan=2 style="text-align:right" | 144
| rowspan=2|243.06955(25)#
| rowspan=2|21(2) s
| β+ (70%)
| 243Cf
| rowspan=2|3/2−#
|-
| α (30%)
| 239Bk
|-
| rowspan=3|244Es
| rowspan=3 style="text-align:right" | 99
| rowspan=3 style="text-align:right" | 145
| rowspan=3|244.07088(20)#
| rowspan=3|37(4) s
| β+ (94.69%)
| 244Cf
| rowspan=3|
|-
| α (5.3%)
| 240Bk
|-
| β+, SF (.01%)
| (various)
|-
| rowspan=2|245Es
| rowspan=2 style="text-align:right" | 99
| rowspan=2 style="text-align:right" | 146
| rowspan=2|245.07132(22)#
| rowspan=2|1.1(1) min
| β+ (60%)
| 245Cf
| rowspan=2|(3/2−)
|-
| α (40%)
| 241Bk
|-
| rowspan=3|246Es
| rowspan=3 style="text-align:right" | 99
| rowspan=3 style="text-align:right" | 147
| rowspan=3|246.07290(24)#
| rowspan=3|7.7(5) min
| β+ (90.1%)
| 246Cf
| rowspan=3|4−#
|-
| α (9.9%)
| 242Bk
|-
| β+, SF (.003%)
| (various)
|-
| rowspan=3|247Es
| rowspan=3 style="text-align:right" | 99
| rowspan=3 style="text-align:right" | 148
| rowspan=3|247.07366(3)#
| rowspan=3|4.55(26) min
| β+ (93%)
| 247Cf
| rowspan=3|7/2+#
|-
| α (7%)
| 243Bk
|-
| SF (9×10−5%)
| (various)
|-
| rowspan=3|248Es
| rowspan=3 style="text-align:right" | 99
| rowspan=3 style="text-align:right" | 149
| rowspan=3|248.07547(6)#
| rowspan=3|27(5) min
| β+ (99.75%)
| 248Cf
| rowspan=3|2−#, 0+#
|-
| α (.25%)
| 244Bk
|-
| β+, SF (3×10−5%)
| (various)
|-
| rowspan=2|249Es
| rowspan=2 style="text-align:right" | 99
| rowspan=2 style="text-align:right" | 150
| rowspan=2|249.07641(3)#
| rowspan=2|102.2(6) min
| β+ (99.43%)
| 249Cf
| rowspan=2|7/2+
|-
| α (.57%)
| 245Bk
|-
| rowspan=2|250Es
| rowspan=2 style="text-align:right" | 99
| rowspan=2 style="text-align:right" | 151
| rowspan=2|250.07861(11)#
| rowspan=2|8.6(1) h
| β+ (97%)
| 250Cf
| rowspan=2|(6+)
|-
| α (3%)
| 246Bk
|-
| rowspan=2 style="text-indent:1em" | 250mEs
| rowspan=2 colspan="3" style="text-indent:2em" | 200(150)# keV
| rowspan=2|2.22(5) h
| EC (99%)
| 250Cf
| rowspan=2|1(−)
|-
| α (1%)
| 246Bk
|-
| rowspan=2|251Es
| rowspan=2 style="text-align:right" | 99
| rowspan=2 style="text-align:right" | 152
| rowspan=2|251.079992(7)
| rowspan=2|33(1) h
| EC (99.51%)
| 251Cf
| rowspan=2|(3/2−)
|-
| α (.49%)
| 247Bk
|-
| rowspan=3|252Es
| rowspan=3 style="text-align:right" | 99
| rowspan=3 style="text-align:right" | 153
| rowspan=3|252.08298(5)
| rowspan=3|471.7(19) d
| α (76%)
| 248Bk
| rowspan=3|(5−)
|-
| EC (24%)
| 252Cf
|-
| β− (.01%)
| 252Fm
|-
| rowspan=2|253Es
| rowspan=2 style="text-align:right" | 99
| rowspan=2 style="text-align:right" | 154
| rowspan=2|253.0848247(28)
| rowspan=2|20.47(3) d
| α
| 249Bk
| rowspan=2|7/2+
|-
| SF (8.7×10−6%)
| (various)
|-
| rowspan=4|254Es
| rowspan=4 style="text-align:right" | 99
| rowspan=4 style="text-align:right" | 155
| rowspan=4|254.088022(5)
| rowspan=4|275.7(5) d
| α
| 250Bk
| rowspan=4|(7+)
|-
| EC (10−4%)
| 254Cf
|-
| SF (3×10−6%)
| (various)
|-
| β− (1.74×10−6%)
| 254Fm
|-
| rowspan=5 style="text-indent:1em" | 254mEs
| rowspan=5 colspan="3" style="text-indent:2em" | 84.2(25) keV
| rowspan=5|39.3(2) h
| β− (98%)
| 254Fm
| rowspan=5|2+
|-
| IT (3%)
| 254Es
|-
| α (.33%)
| 250Bk
|-
| EC (.078%)
| 254Cf
|-
| SF (.0045%)
| (various)
|-
| rowspan=3|255Es
| rowspan=3 style="text-align:right" | 99
| rowspan=3 style="text-align:right" | 156
| rowspan=3|255.090273(12)
| rowspan=3|39.8(12) d
| β− (92%)
| 255Fm
| rowspan=3|(7/2+)
|-
| α (8%)
| 251Bk
|-
| SF (.0041%)
| (various)
|-
| 256Es
| style="text-align:right" | 99
| style="text-align:right" | 157
| 256.09360(11)#
| 25.4(24) min
| β−
| 256Fm
| (1+, 0−)
|-
| rowspan=2 style="text-indent:1em" | 256mEs
| rowspan=2 colspan="3" style="text-indent:2em" | 0(100)# keV
| rowspan=2|7.6 h
| β− (99.99%)
| 256Fm
| rowspan=2|(8+)
|-
| β−, SF (.002%)
| (various)
|-
| rowspan=2|257Es
| rowspan=2 style="text-align:right" | 99
| rowspan=2 style="text-align:right" | 158
| rowspan=2|257.09598(44)#
| rowspan=2|7.7(2) d
| β−
| 257Fm
| rowspan=2|7/2+#
|-
| α
| 253Bk

References 

 Isotope masses from:

 Isotopic compositions and standard atomic masses from:

 Half-life, spin, and isomer data selected from the following sources.

 
Einsteinium
Einsteinium